Freyr Gauti Sigmundsson (born 17 January 1972) is an Icelandic judoka. He competed in the men's half-middleweight event at the 1992 Summer Olympics.

References

1972 births
Living people
Freyr Gauti Sigmundsson
Freyr Gauti Sigmundsson
Judoka at the 1992 Summer Olympics
Place of birth missing (living people)